Abū Bakra al-Thaqafī better known as Nufayʿ ibn al-Ḥārith was the half brother of Nafi ibn al-Harith. He is known for his dispute with another Islamic general al-Mughira ibn Shu'ba during a military expedition.

Other sources describe him as the uterine brother of Ziyad ibn Abihi.

See also 
 Al-Harith ibn Kalada
 List of notable Hijazis

References 

7th-century Arabs
Banu Thaqif
Sahabah hadith narrators